Sankofa is an oogenus of prismatoolithid egg. They are fairly small, smooth-shelled, and asymmetrical. Sankofa may represent the fossilized eggs of a transitional species between non-avian theropods and birds.

Etymology
The name Sankofa comes from the Ashante word "sankofa", meaning 'learning from the past', symbolized by a bird with an egg in its bill. The oospecific epiphet pyrenaica refers to the Pyrenees, where the eggs were first discovered.

Distribution
Sankofa pyrenaica is known solely from the Aren Formation, in the southern Pyrenees of Catalonia, Spain, dating from the Upper Campanian to Lower Maastrichtian.

Description
Sankofa eggs are uniformly 7 cm long and 4 cm wide, and their eggshell averages 0.27 mm thick. The eggshell consists of two layers, the prismatic (or palisade) layer and the mammillary layer, similar to most other non-avian dinosaur eggshells. In Sankofa, these two layers have a gradual boundary, and the mammillary layer is much thinner than the prismatic. The prismatic has a slightly squamatic microstructure, very similar to the eggs of Troodon and other prismatoolithids, a step towards the fully squamatic texture of bird eggs. The eggshell has a smooth surface with no trace of ornamentation, and highly variable pore density.

The most significant characteristic of Sankofa is its shape: they are asymmetric, with an ovoid shape, like bird eggs. A morphometric analysis by López-Martínez and Vicens in 2012 found that it was an intermediate shape between avian and non-avian theropods, and also very similar to an enantiornithine egg from the Bajo de la Carpa Formation in Argentina, though their microstructures are quite different.

Classification
Parataxonomically, Sankofa is classified in the oofamily Prismatoolithidae, because of its microstructure. Cladistic analysis found Sankofa to be in a polytomy with Protoceratopsidovum, Troodon eggs, and birds. The mosaic of avian and non-avian characteristics makes it uncertain whether S. pyrenaica was laid by a bird or a non-avian theropod, and provides further evidence for the theory that birds evolved from dinosaurs. It probably represents a transitional form between the two groups.

References

Fossils of Spain
Egg fossils
Dinosaur reproduction
Fossil parataxa described in 2012